SM U-55  was one of the six Type U-51 U-boats of the Imperial German Navy during the First World War.

Construction and commissioning
U-55 was ordered from Germaniawerft, Kiel on 23 August 1914, was laid down on 28 December 1914 and launched on 18 March 1916. She was commissioned under her first commander Wilhelm Werner on 8 June 1916.

In German service
Her most famous act was the sinking of the British passenger liner  with three torpedoes, on 17 July 1918, off the east coast of Ireland. Carpathia herself had become famous for her actions in coming to the rescue of the sinking  in 1912. U-55 also sank the hospital ship  on 4 January 1918.

Werner was replaced by Alexander Weiss on 10 August 1918, Weiss being succeeded by Hans Friedrich on 15 September and commanding U-55 until the armistice on 11 November 1918.

In Japanese service
On 26 November 1918 U-55 was surrendered to the Royal Navy at Harwich, along with the rest of the surviving U-Boat fleet. It was subsequently handed over to Japan, and entered service with the Imperial Japanese Navy in 1920 as O-3, serving as such until 1921. It was dismantled at the Sasebo Navy Yard between March and June 1921, briefly recommissioning in 1923 as Auxiliary Vessel No. 2538.

Summary of raiding history

Original documents from Room 40

See also 
Room 40

References

Notes

Citations

Bibliography

External links
Photos of cruises of German submarine U-54 in 1916-1918. Great photo quality, comments in German.
A 44 min. film from 1917 about a cruise of the German submarine U-35. A German propaganda film without dead or wounded; many details about submarine warfare in World War I.

Room 40:  original documents, photos and maps about World War I German submarine warfare and British Room 40 Intelligence from The National Archives, Kew, Richmond, UK.

World War I submarines of Germany
Type U 51 submarines
Ships built in Kiel
1916 ships
U-boats commissioned in 1916
Foreign submarines of the Imperial Japanese Navy
Auxiliary ships of the Imperial Japanese Navy